Greitist Iz is the debut studio album by Italian singer-songwriter Francesco Gabbani. It was released in Italy through DIY Italia on the 27 May 2014. The album reached number 59 on the Italian Albums Chart. The album includes the single "I dischi non si suonano".

The phrase Greitist Iz, which has no meaning, has been chosen as it sounds like Greatest hits if read as it were Italian.

Track listing

Charts

Weekly charts

Release history

References

2014 albums
Francesco Gabbani albums